Harmaston is a place in unincorporated northeast Harris County, Texas, United States that used to be a distinct community in Texas.

Harmaston, located at the southwest corner of Lake Houston, was developed along the timber shipping railroad line Beaumont, Sour Lake and Western Railway. Lumbermen from several companies, such as the Texas Longleaf Company, lived in a boarding house in Harmaston. By the 1980s the remaining component of the community was an abandoned railway station.

Education
Children attended school in the City of Humble.

References

External links

Geography of Harris County, Texas
Unincorporated communities in Texas